Oswaldo Euclides de Sousa Aranha (15 February 1894 – 27 January 1960) was a Brazilian politician, diplomat and statesman, who came to national prominence in 1930 under Getúlio Vargas.

He is known in international politics for lobbying for the creation of the State of Israel as head of the Brazilian delegation to the UN and President of the UN General Assembly in 1947. As head of the Brazilian delegation, he was President of the United Nations General Assembly in 1947 during the UNGA 181 vote on the United Nations Partition Plan for Palestine, in which he postponed the vote for three days to ensure its passage.
For his efforts on Palestine, he was nominated for the Nobel Peace Prize in 1948.

Early life and career

Oswaldo Aranha was born in Brazil in the city of Alegrete in the state of Rio Grande do Sul. Aranha obtained his bachelor's degree in Law and Social Sciences through the Law School of now-called Federal University of Rio de Janeiro (Faculdade de Direito do Rio de Janeiro) in 1916. After his graduation, he returned to the state of Rio Grande do Sul and practiced as a lawyer for eight years, establishing a personal and professional contact with Getulio Vargas, who also was  a lawyer. His first public post was that of Assistant Police Commissioner in his native state.

Aranha fought the insurrection of 1923, deflagrated by sectors that opposed the fifth consecutive re-election of Borges de Medeiros as governor of Rio Grande do Sul. By personally commanding an irregular armed force composed by civilians, Aranha fought new uprisings promoted by the opposition in the years that led to the Revolution of 1930.

In a speedy political career, Oswaldo Aranha ran for his first elective office in 1926 and was elected Mayor of Alegrete, but soon became a member of the state legislature and later elected to the National Congress in 1928.

When Vargas ran as opposition candidate for president of Brazil in 1930 and lost, Aranha joined with the tenentes to convince Vargas to organize a revolt.  When the revolt succeeded, Aranha took the first of several positions in the Cabinet of Brazil under now-President Vargas, heading the Ministry of Finance, the Ministry of Justice, and the Ministry of External Relations, among other positions.

Aranha also served as Ambassador to the United States in 1934 where he gained recognition as a strong supporter of Pan-Americanism. In 1937 he returned to Brazil to head the Ministry of Foreign Affairs. Dr. Aranha played a large role in the Rio de Janeiro Conference of 1942.

Support for Allies in World War II 
While serving as Minister of External Relations, Brazil took part in the first three consultative meetings of the Ministers of External Relations of the American Republics which defined Pan-American policy during the early stages of World War II and worked out the recommendation for the collective severance of diplomatic relations with the Axis Powers. During the 1942 Rio conference, he announced that Brazil had cut all diplomatic ties with Nazi Germany, thereby siding with the United States and the Allies. Eventually, most Central and South American states did the same with the exception of Argentina and Chile.

At the first Special Session of the UN General Assembly held in 1947, Oswaldo Aranha, the head of the Brazilian delegation to the UN, began a tradition that has remained in which the first speaker at the major international forum is always a Brazilian.

Honour in Israel

Aranha supported and heavily lobbied for the partition of Palestine toward the creation of the State of Israel. Streets in Israeli cities such as Beer-Sheva and Ramat-Gan, and a square in Jerusalem are named after Aranha. In 2007, a street in Tel Aviv was named in his honor at a ceremony attended by his relatives and Brazil's ambassador to Israel.

The photobiography of Oswaldo Aranha published by Pedro Corrêa do Lago in 2017 shows how Oswaldo Aranha, in his position as president of the United Nations General Assembly in 1947, was highly instrumental for the assembly's approval of the partition of Palestine insofar as he was able to postpone the voting by two days, as Corrêa do Lago explains: “[Aranha] was skillful and when he saw that the partition would not obtain 2/3 of the votes on time he got its allies to stretch their speeches to the max to prevent the vote from being taken that day. The decision was postponed [by Aranha] and as the next day was a holiday in the United States this move bought the time needed to get the [additional] votes.”

Controversy 
A book by the historian Maria Luiza Tucci Carneiro argues that Aranha was aware of secret circulars asking that Jews be denied entry visas to Brazil and did little to change that. Jeffrey Lesser's prize-winning Welcoming the Undesirables: Brazil and the Jewish Question questions that conclusion by showing that Jewish entry rose notably after the secret circulars were emitted, with the active collaboration of many Brazilian diplomats and businesspeople.

The circular asking for the denial of visas to Jews, however, was not edited by Oswaldo Aranha, and it was not made during his term as Minister of External Relations for Brazil. Mário de Pimentel Brandão was responsible for signing the harmful secret circular in 1937 during his term as Minister of External Relations for Brazil.

During Oswaldo Aranha's time as Minister for External Relations, from 1938 to 1944, many Jews were granted visas to Brazil despite the circulars. In 1939, Jews were granted 4601 permanent and temporary resident visas to Brazil. That year, 9% of all permanent residency visas and 14% of temporary Brazilian visas were emitted to people of Jewish origin. In 1940, 2500 Jewish immigrants were given visas to Brazil.

Considered a moderate by many in and outside of Brazil, he argued that communism  was the result of "the Judaism which created and maintains this ambience, capable of sending this civilization into an abyss."

Albert Einstein asked Oswaldo Aranha for help in obtaining a visa for his friend who was a German Jew, Helene Fabian-Katz. Einstein had previously appealed to the US government for help, but the it denied Fabian-Katz a visa.  Fabian-Katz was granted a visa to Brazil and joined her brother, who already lived in São Paulo.

Footnotes and references

|-

|-

|-

|-

|-

|-

|-

External links

Aranha on the cover of the January 19, 1942 issue of Time
 

1894 births
1960 deaths
20th-century Brazilian lawyers
Brazilian diplomats
People from Alegrete
World War II political leaders
Presidents of the United Nations General Assembly
Governors of Rio Grande do Sul
Permanent Representatives of Brazil to the United Nations
Ambassadors of Brazil to the United States
Finance Ministers of Brazil
Ministers of Justice of Brazil
Members of the Legislative Assembly of Rio Grande do Sul
Grand Crosses 1st class of the Order of Merit of the Federal Republic of Germany
Vargas Era
Republican Party of Rio Grande do Sul politicians
Agriculture ministers of Brazil
Foreign ministers of Brazil